Li Jong-kap (Hangul: 이종갑, Hanja: 李鍾甲; 18 March 1918 – 1993) was a South Korean football defender who played for the South Korea in the 1954 FIFA World Cup. He also played for Joseon Electric Power.

References

External links
FIFA profile
Biography of Li Jong-kap

1918 births
1993 deaths
South Korean footballers
South Korea international footballers
Association football defenders
1954 FIFA World Cup players
Asian Games medalists in football
Footballers at the 1954 Asian Games
Medalists at the 1954 Asian Games
Asian Games silver medalists for South Korea